Attica Locke (born 1974 in Houston, Texas) is an American fiction author and writer/producer for television and film.

Career
A 1995 graduate of Northwestern University School of Communication, Locke was a fellow at the Sundance Institute's Feature Filmmakers Lab in 1999, studying screenwriting and directing. She has written scripts for Paramount, Warner Bros., Disney, 20th Century Fox, Jerry Bruckheimer Films, HBO, and DreamWorks. She was a writer and producer on the Fox drama Empire. Most recently, she was a writer and producer on Netflix's When They See Us and the Hulu adaptation of Little Fires Everywhere.

In 2021, it was announced that Locke would serve as executive producer and showrunner for the Netflix Limited Series From Scratch, an adaptation of her sister Tembi Locke's 2019 memoir entitled From Scratch: A Memoir of Love, Sicily and Finding Home. It premiered on Netflix in October 2022.

Personal life
Locke was born in Houston, Texas, to parents who were active in the civil rights movement at the turn of the 1970s. They named her after the 1971 Attica Prison rebellion in upstate New York.

She now lives in Los Angeles, California, with her husband and daughter. Actress Tembi Locke is her older sister.

She is a member of the Writers Guild of America, West.

Bibliography
 Black Water Rising (2009), HarperCollins 
 The Cutting Season (2012), Dennis Lehane / HarperCollins 
 Pleasantville (2015), HarperCollins
 Bluebird, Bluebird (2017), Mulholland Books
 Heaven, My Home (2019), Mulholland Books. This book was mentioned in the New York Times article "The Best Crime Novels of the Year".

Awards

2013: Ernest J. Gaines Award for Literary Excellence – The Cutting Season, (award sponsored by the Baton Rouge Area Foundation; established in 2007 to honor Ernest Gaines' legacy)
2016: Harper Lee Prize for Legal Fiction, 2016 – Pleasantville – the award is sponsored by the University of Alabama School of Law and the American Bar Association Journal.
2018: Edgar Allan Poe Award for Best Novel of the Year – Bluebird, Bluebird
2018: Anthony Award for Best Novel – Bluebird, Bluebird
2018: CWA Ian Fleming Steel Dagger Award – Bluebird, Bluebird
2020: Staunch Book Prize – Heaven, My Home

Nominations
For Bluebird, Bluebird:

2018 Los Angeles Times Book Award finalist

For Pleasantville:

Longlisted for the 2016 Bailey's Women's Prize for Fiction

For The Cutting Season:

 Finalist for the Hurston-Wright Legacy Award  
 Honor Book by the Black Caucus of the American Library Association
 Long-listed for the Chautauqua Prize

For Black Water Rising:
 Short-listed for the 2010 Orange Prize
 Nominated for a 2010 Edgar Award
 Nominated for a 2010 NAACP Image Award
 2009 Los Angeles Times Book Award finalist
 Nominated for a 2009 Strand Magazine Critics Award
 Finalist for the Hurston-Wright Legacy Award  
 Indie Next Pick 2009 & 2010

References

Further reading

External links

 Attica Locke's website
 

1974 births
20th-century African-American people
20th-century African-American women
21st-century African-American women writers
21st-century African-American writers
21st-century American novelists
21st-century American screenwriters
21st-century American women writers
African-American novelists
African-American screenwriters
American television writers
American women novelists
American women screenwriters
American women television writers
Anthony Award winners
Edgar Award winners
Living people
Northwestern University alumni
Novelists from Texas
Screenwriters from Texas
Writers from Houston